The 1988 National Soccer League First Division was the fourth edition of the NSL First Division in South Africa. It was won by Mamelodi Sundowns.

Table

References

NSL First Division seasons